A military order is a Christian religious society of knights. The original military orders were the Knights Templar, the Knights Hospitaller, the Order of Saint James, the Order of Calatrava, and the Teutonic Knights. They arose in the Middle Ages in association with the Crusades, both in the Holy Land, the Baltics, and the Iberian peninsula; their members being dedicated to the protection of pilgrims and the defence of the Crusader states. They are the predecessors of chivalric orders.

Most members of military orders were laymen who took religious vows, such as of poverty, chastity, and obedience, according to monastic ideals. The orders owned houses called commanderies all across Europe and had a hierarchical structure of leadership with the grand master at the top.

The Knights Templar, the largest and most influential of the military orders, was suppressed in the early fourteenth century; only a handful of orders were established and recognized afterwards. However, some persisted longer in their original functions, such as the Sovereign Military Order of Malta and the Order of Saint John, the respective Catholic and Protestant successors of the Knights Hospitaller. Those military orders that survive today have evolved into purely honorific or ceremonial orders or else into charitable foundations.

History

In 1053, for the Battle of Civitate, the Knights of Saint Peter was founded as a militia by Pope Leo IX to counter the Normans.

In response to the Islamic conquests of the former Byzantine Empire, numerous Catholic military orders were set up following the First Crusade. The founding of such orders suited the Catholic church's plan of channeling the devotion of the European nobility toward achieving the Church's temporal goals, and it also complemented the Peace and Truce of God. The foundation of the Knights Templar in 1118 provided the first in a series of tightly organized military forces for the purpose of opposing Islamic conquests in the Holy Land and in the Iberian Peninsula — see the Reconquista — as well as Islamic invaders and pagan tribes in Eastern Europe which were perceived as threats to the Church's supremacy.

The first secularized military order was the Order of Saint George, founded in 1326 by King Charles I of Hungary, through which he made all the Hungarian nobility swear loyalty to him. Shortly thereafter, the Order of the "Knights of the Band" was founded in 1332 by King Alfonso XI of Castile. Both orders existed only for about a century.

Purpose
The original features of the military orders were the combination of religious and military ways of life. Some of them, like the Knights Hospitaller, the Knights of Saint Thomas, and the Order of Saints Maurice and Lazarus also had charitable purposes and cared for the sick and poor. However, they were not purely male institutions, as nuns could attach themselves as convents of the orders. One significant feature of the military orders was that clerical brothers could be subordinate to non-ordained brethren.

In 1818, orientalist Joseph von Hammer compared the Catholic military orders, in particular the Knights Templar, to certain Islamic models such as the Muslim sect of Assassins. In 1820, José Antonio Conde suggested they were modeled on the ribat, a fortified religious institution which brought together a religious or hospital way of life with fighting the enemies of Islam. However popular such views may have become, others have criticized this view, suggesting there were no such ribats around Outremer until after the military orders had been founded.

The role and function of the military orders extended beyond their military exploits in the Holy Land, Prussia, and the Baltics. In fact, they had extensive holdings and staff throughout Western Europe. The majority were laymen. They provided a conduit for cultural and technical innovation, such as the introduction of fulling into England by the Knights Hospitaller, and the banking facilities of the Knights Templar.

Northern crusades

In 1147 Bernard of Clairvaux persuaded Pope Eugenius III that the Germans' and Danes' conflict with the pagan Wends was a holy war analogous to the Reconquista; he urged a crusade until all heathens were baptised or killed. The new crusaders' motivation was primarily economic: the acquisition of new arable lands and serfs; the control of Baltic trade routes; and the abolishment of the Novgorodian merchants' monopoly of the fur trade. From the early 13thcentury the military orders provided garrisons in Old Livonia and defended the German commercial centre, Riga. The Livonian Brothers of the Sword and the Order of Dobrzyń were established by local bishops. The Sword Brothers were notorious for cruelty to "pagans" and converts alike. The Teutonic Knights were founded during the 1190s in Palestine, but their strong links to Germany diverted efforts from the Holy Land to the Baltic. Between 1229 and 1290, the Teutonic Knights absorbed both the Brothers of the Sword and the Order of Dobrzyń, subjugated most of the Baltic tribes and established a ruthless and exploitative monastic state. The Knights invited foreign nobility to join their regular Reisen, or raids, against the last unconquered Baltic people, the Lithuanians. These were fashionable events of chivalric entertainment among young aristocrats. Jogaila, Grand Duke of Lithuania, converted to Catholicism and married Queen Jadwiga of Poland resulting in a united Polish–Lithuanian army routing the Knights at Tannenberg in 1410. The Knights' state survived, from 1466 under Polish suzerainty. Prussia was transformed into a secular duchy in 1525, and Livonia in 1562.

List of military orders
These are military orders listed chronologically according to their dates of foundation and extinction, sometimes approximate due to scarce sources, and/or repeated suppressions by Papal or royal authorities. Presently active institutions are listed in consideration with their legitimacy according to the International Commission on Orders of Chivalry.

They are divided into international and national according to their adherence, mission, and enrollment, disregarding the extent of eventual gradual geographical distribution outside of their region of concern.

International

National

Other
Chivalric and/or military orders that could qualify depending on definition.
 Confraternity of Belchite, "experimental" confraternity of knights founded in 1122 by King Alfonso the Battler of Aragon
 Order of Saint Blaise, founded in the 12th century in Armenia to defend the country against the attacks of the Muslims
 Knights of the Band, early honorific military order founded c. 1330 by King Alfonso XI of Castile
 Supreme Order of the Most Holy Annunciation, military order founded in 1350 by Duke Amadeus VI, Count of Savoy, the first called the Order of the True Lover's Knots in memory of a bracelet of hair presented to the founder by a lady, but upon the election of Amadeus VIII to the pontificate in 1439, it changed its name for that of the Annunciation of angel Gabriel
 Order of the Dove, short-lived (one year) and controversial order founded in 1379 by King Juan I of Castile
 Order of Saint Anthony (Bavaria), Bavarian military order founded in 1382 by Duke Albert I, Duke of Bavaria
 Military Order of Cross-bearers with the Red Star on a Blue Field, hospitaller and/military order active from the 12th century until suppressed in 1656 by Pope Alexander VII.
 Order of Saint Hubert, early honorific military order founded in 1444 or 1445 by Gerhard VII, Duke of Jülich-Berg
 Blood of Jesus Christ (military order), founded in Mantua, Italy, by Vincenzo I Gonzaga, Duke of Mantua, approved on 25 May 1608 by Pope Paul V
 , founded in 1261 by King Ferdinand III of Castile

Modern development
A few of the institutions survived into honorific and/or charitable organizations, including the papal orders of knighthood.

While other contemporary Catholic societies may share some military organizational features and ideology, such as the Society of Jesus, they differ from the medieval military orders in the absence of military purposes or potential.

Modern orders may still be founded explicitly as a military order; the Military Order of Loyalty was founded in 1946 by the Spanish protectorate in Morocco. Awarded to both Spanish and Moroccan military officers and soldiers, the single-class order was abolished in 1956.

See also
 Spanish knights orders
 Chivalric order
 Order (honour)
 Warrior monk

References

Bibliography
 
 Nicholson, Helen J. The Knights Hospitaller (2001).
 Riley-Smith, Jonathan. Hospitallers: The History of the Order of St John (1999).
 Morten, Nicholas Edward. The Teutonic Knights in the Holy Land 1190-1291 (Woodbridge: Boydell Press, 2009)
Forey, Alan John. The Military Orders: From the Twelfth to the Early Fourteenth Centuries. *(Basingstoke: Macmillan Education, 1992)
 

 
Military units and formations of the Middle Ages